Kaddamakhi (Dargwa: Къаддамахьи) is a rural locality (a selo) in Kassagumakhinsky Selsoviet, Akushinsky District, Republic of Dagestan, Russia. The population was 94 as of 2010. There are 2 streets.

Geography 
Kaddamakhi is located 39 km south of Akusha (the district's administrative centre) by road, on the Khunikotta River. Bikalamakhi is the nearest rural locality.

References 

Rural localities in Akushinsky District